The Zeppelin LZ 13 Hansa (or simply Hansa) was a German civilian rigid airship first flown in 1912. It was built for DELAG to carry passengers and post and flew the first international passenger flight, visiting Denmark and Sweden in September 1912.  In 1913 it was hired to the Imperial German Navy as a training craft, and at the outbreak of World War I it was requisitioned by the German military who used it for bombing, reconnaissance, and finally as a training airship.

Design
The Hansa was the sister ship of LZ 11 Viktoria Luise, the first of  the two G Class Zeppelins built.

Civilian flights 
The closed passenger cabin was attached to the hull behind the open control cabin and had room for 24 passengers. From 1912 to 1914 the Hansa was operating mostly from Hamburg and Potsdam, and based in Dresden at the outbreak of the war. 
Count Zeppelin commanded the Hansa on the first commercial airship flight from to Denmark and Sweden on 19 September 1912.

This was the first time a commercial Zeppelin flew outside Germany. Click on the blue globes to see the route taken:
 03:55  early morning launch from Hamburg, Germany
 07:15  over the Hyllekrog spit on Lolland island
 07:20  over Gedser
 08:00  over Maribo
 08:25  over Vordingborg
 08:40  over Faxe
 09:10  over Herfølge
 09:30  over Køge
 10:00  over Taastrup
 10:20  landed at Copenhagen, where people wrote postcards to family in Germany
 11:55  launched from Copenhagen and flew over Malmö
 13:30   over Nykøbing Falster
 15:30  over Lübeck
 16:40   landed back in Hamburg

During two years of commercial DELAG service it carried 6,217 passengers on 399 flights, covering 44,437 kilometres.

Military use 

 The military added a platform to the top of the hull and installed two machine guns
 Attack missions on France and reconnaissance missions over the Baltic Sea (involved in the taking of Libau)
 From early 1915 used as a training airship, making over 500 flights over Berlin
 Dismantled in August 1916

See also
Timeline of hydrogen technologies

Specifications

Notes

References

External links 

 silhoeuttes of important Zeppelins from 1900 to 1919, Lueger 1904-1920, shows LZ: 1,3,5,6,8,10,13,14,18,21,23,25,26,36,40,59,62,91,94,95,100,104,113,120
 photograph of Hansa landed at Copenhagen 1912-09-19
 photograph of Count Zeppelin talking from Hansa's gondola at Copenhagen 1912-09-19
 photograph of Count Zeppelin shaking hands from Hansa at Copenhagen 1912-09-19
 photograph of Hansa leaving Copenhagen 1912-09-19

1910s German airliners
Zeppelins
1912 in Germany
Aircraft first flown in 1912